Purvis High School is a school within the Lamar County School District. It is located at 220 School St., Purvis, Mississippi.

The principal is Brad Skeen. The school colors are purple and gold.  The school mascot is a tornado, named after the deadly tornado that struck on April 24, 1908.

Statistics

For the 20202021 school year, the school had 605 students enrolled and about 42 teachers employed.

Athletics
Purvis High School is home to the Purvis Tornadoes. The school has football, basketball, baseball, soccer, golf, tennis, softball, track & field, and swimming teams.

Baseball

{| class="wikitable" style="font-size: 95%"
|- bgcolor="#efefef"
! AcademicYear !! Class !! Coach !! FinalRecord !! Season Results
|-
| 2000-2001 || 8-3A || Tony Farlow || 14-11 || Lost 1st round playoff (West Lauderdale) 0-2
|-
| 2001-2002 || 8-3A || Tony Farlow || 29-9 || style="background: #FAAC58;"|Won 1st round playoff (North Pike) 2-0Won 2nd round playoff (Morton) 2-0Won 3A South State Championship (Greene Co.) 2-1Lost 3A State Championship (Senatobia) 0-2
|-
| 2002-2003 || 8-3A || Tony Farlow || 24-9 || Won 1st round playoff (Morton) 2-1Won 2nd round playoff (Philadelphia) 2-0Lost 3A South State Championship (Greene Co.) 1-2
|-
| 2003-2004 ||8-3A || Tony Farlow || 32-6 || style="background: #FA5858;"|Won 1st round Double Elimination Tournament (Carthage, Morton, West Marion) 3-1Won 2nd round playoff (Raleigh) 2-0Won 3A South State Championship (West Lauderdale) 2-1Won 3A State Championship (Cleveland) 2-1 Ranked #1 in the Clarion Ledger final season poll.
|-
| 2004-2005 || 8-3A || Tony Farlow || 24-11 || style="background: #FA5858;"|Won 1st round Double Elimination Tournament (Columbia, Franklin Co., Hazelhurst) 3-0Won 2nd round playoff (Morton) 2-0Won 3A South State Championship (West Lauderdale) 2-1Won 3A State Championship (Senatobia) 2-0
|-
| 2005-2006 || 8-3A || Tony Farlow || 10-12 || Missed Playoffs
|-
| 2006-2007 || 8-3A || Tony Farlow || 21-13 || style="background: #FAAC58;"|Won 1st round playoff (South East Lauderdale) 2-0Won 2nd round playoff (Richland) 2-0Won 3A South State Championship (Sumrall) 2-1Lost 3A State Championship (Nettleton) 1-2
|-
| 2007-2008 || 8-3A || Tony Farlow || 17-10|| Won 3A 1st round playoff (Jefferson Co.) 2-0 Lost 3A 2nd round playoff (Newton Co.) 0-2
|-
| 2008-2009 || 8-3A || Tony Farlow || 23-8|| Won 3A 1st round playoff (Magee) 2-0  Won 3A 2nd round playoff (Newton Co.) 2-1  Won 3A 3rd round playoff (Perry Central) 2-0 Lost 3A South State Championship (Sumrall) 0-2
|-
| 2009-2010 || 8-4A || Tony Farlow || 17-10 ||  Lost 4A 1st round playoff (West Lauderdale) 1-2
|-
| 2010-2011 || 8-4A || Tony Farlow || 20-8|| style="background: #819FF7;"| Bye 4A 1st round playoff (Received bye for winning district championship) Won 4A 2nd round playoff (Lawrence Co.) 2-0  Won 4A 3rd round playoff (Magee) 2-1 Lost 4A South State Championship (Columbia) 0-2
|-
| 2011-2012 || 7-4A || Tony Farlow || 26-5||  style="background: #FA5858;"|Bye 4A 1st round playoff (Received bye for winning district championship) Won 4A 2nd round playoff (Newton Co.) 2-0  Won 4A 3rd round playoff (Richland) 2-0 Won 4A South State Championship (West Lauderdale) 2-0 Won 4A State Championship (Lewisburg) 2-1#1 in state and #5 in nation in team ERA.
|-
| 2012-2013 || 7-4A || Tony Farlow || 15-12||  style="background: #819FF7;"|Bye 4A 1st round playoff (Received bye for winning district championship) Lost 4A 2nd round playoff (Germantown) 0-2 
|-
| 2013-2014 || 7-4A || Tony Farlow || 27-10||  style="background: #FAAC58;"|Won 4A 1st round playoff (Quitman) 2-0  Won 4A 2nd round playoff (St. Stanislaus) 2-0  Won 4A 3rd round playoff (Richland) 2-0  Won 4A South State Championship (Columbia) 2-0  Lost 4A State Championship (West Lauderdale) 0-2
|-
| 14 seasons || || || 299-13469% ||13 playoff appearances41 playoff rounds played (65-26)5 District Championships('02, '05, '11, '12, '13)6 South State Championships ('02, '04, '05, '07, '12, '14)3 State Championships ('04, '05, '12)
|-
|}

Purvis Tornado Baseball Players at the next level

(*) The records, opponents, and season results have been verified using microfilm of past issues of the Hattiesburg American located in Cook Library on the campus of the University of Southern Mississippi.

Football

The team plays in Cowart Stadium, named for past football coach Don Cowart.  Below is a chart depicting the Tornadoes' history, followed by a synopsis of selected seasons.  (Team in parenthesis is opponent).

{| class="wikitable" style="font-size: 95%"
|- bgcolor="#efefef"
! Year !! Class !! Coach !! Season !! Final !!PF!!PA!! Season Results
|-
| 1941-1942 || || Don Cowart || 8-0 ||style="background: #FFCCCC;"|11-0 ||325||19||style="background: #CCFFFF;"|Won 1st round playoff (Mt. Olive)Won 2nd round playoff (Lumberton)Won 3rd Round playoff (FCAHS)Unscored upon during regular season
|-
| style="background: #FFE6BD;"| ||style="background: #FFE6BD;"| ||style="background: #FFE6BD;"|Don Cowart ||style="background: #FFE6BD;"| ||style="background: #FFE6BD;"| ||style="background: #FFE6BD;"| ||style="background: #FFE6BD;"| ||style="background: #FFE6BD;"| 
|-
| 1964-1965 || Desoto ||?|| 4-4-2 ||4-4-2||132||110||
|-
| 1974-1975 || Apache || Jack Craft || || || || ||
|-
| 1975-1976 || Apache || Jack Craft ||8-2||style="background: #FFCCCC;"|8-3 ||232||78||style="background: #CCFFFF;"|Lost Apache Championship (TBD)
|-
| 1976-1977 || Apache || Jack Craft || || || || ||
|-
| 1977-1978 || Apache || Jack Craft || || || || ||
|-
| 1978-1979 || style="background: #D0E7FF;"|Apache || Jack Craft ||7-1-1 ||style="background: #FFCCCC;"|8-1-1 || || ||style="background: #CCFFFF;"|Won Apache Championship (West Marion)
|-
| 1979-1980 || Apache || Jack Craft ||5-4 ||style="background: #FFCCCC;"|5-4 ||156||109||
|-
| 1980-1981 || style="background: #D0E7FF;"|Apache || Jack Craft ||6-3 ||style="background: #FFCCCC;"|6-3-1 ||140||124||style="background: #CCFFFF;"|Tied Apache Championship (Poplarville)
|-
|align="center" Colspan="11" style="background: #003b7b;"|Mississippi High School Athletic Association Reorganization (Changed to Championship Format) 
|-
| 1981-1982 || 8-A North|| Jack Craft ||2-7 (1-2)||2-7 || || ||
|-
| 1982-1983 || 8-A North|| Jack Craft||5-4 (4-2)||style="background: #FFCCCC;"|5-4 || || ||
|-
| 1983-1984 || 8-A North|| Jack Craft||4-6 (2-2)||4-6 || || ||
|-
| 1984-1985 || 8-3A North|| Jack Craft||4-6 (2-2)||4-6 || || ||
|-
| 1985-1986 || style="background: #D0E7FF;"|8-3A North|| Jack Craft||9-1 (4-0)||style="background: #FFCCCC;"|9-2 || || ||style="background: #CCFFFF;"|Lost 8-3A Division Championship (Bay High)
|-
| 1986-1987 || 8-3A North|| Jack Craft||5-5 (3-1)||5-5 ||154 ||184 ||
|-
| 1987-1988 || 15-3A ||Jack Craft ||5-4 (1-3)||style="background: #FFCCCC;"|5-4 || || ||
|-
| 1988-1989 || 15-3A || Jack Craft||1-8 (1-3)||1-8 || || ||
|-
| 1989-1990 || 15-3A || Jack Craft ||5-5 (3-2) ||5-5 || || ||
|-
| style="background: #FFE6BD;"| ||style="background: #FFE6BD;"| ||style="background: #FFE6BD;"|Jack Craft ||style="background: #FFE6BD;"| ||style="background: #FFE6BD;"| ||style="background: #FFE6BD;"| ||style="background: #FFE6BD;"| ||style="background: #FFE6BD;"|
|-
| 1990-1991 || 15-3A ||Robert Walker ||3-7 (2-3)||3-7 || || ||
|-
| 1991-1992 || 8-3A ||Robert Walker|| 1-9 (1-5)|| 1-9 || || ||
|-
| 1992-1993 || 8-3A ||Robert Walker || 1-9 (1-5)|| 1-9 || || ||
|-
| style="background: #FFE6BD;"| 3 seasons||style="background: #FFE6BD;"| ||style="background: #FFE6BD;"| Robert Walker||style="background: #FFE6BD;"|5-25 ||style="background: #FFE6BD;"| 5-25 ||style="background: #FFE6BD;"| ||style="background: #FFE6BD;"| ||style="background: #FFE6BD;"| 16.67% overall win percentage
|-
| 1993-1994 || 8-3A ||Jim Sizemore|| 4-7 (3-3)|| 4-7 ||148||185||
|-
| 1994-1995 || 8-3A ||Jim Sizemore|| 4-6 (2-4)|| 4-6 ||148||205||
|-
| 1995-1996 || 8-3A ||Jim Sizemore|| 9-2 (4-1)|| style="background: #FFCCCC;"|9-3||236||125|| style="background: #CCFFFF;"|Lost 3A 1st round playoff (Forest)
|-
| 1996-1997 || style="background: #D0E7FF;"|8-3A || Jim Sizemore || 10-0 (5-0)|| style="background: #FFCCCC;"|10-1 ||267||49|| style="background: #CCFFFF;"|Lost 3A 1st round playoff (Prentiss)
|-
| 1997-1998 || style="background: #D0E7FF;"| 8-3A || Jim Sizemore || 10-0 (5-0)|| style="background: #FFCCCC;"|12-1 ||397||125||style="background: #CCFFFF;"| Won 3A 1st round playoff (Amite Co.) Won 3A 2nd round playoff (Forest) Lost 3A South State Championship (Magee)
|-
| 1998-1999 || style="background: #D0E7FF;"| 8-3A || Jim Sizemore || 9-1 (5-0)|| style="background: #FFCCCC;"|10-2 ||303||70|| style="background: #CCFFFF;"|Won 3A 1st round playoff (Velma Jackson) Lost 3A second round playoff (Magee)
|-
| style="background: #FFE6BD;"|6 seasons ||style="background: #FFE6BD;"| ||style="background: #FFE6BD;"|Jim Sizemore ||style="background: #FFE6BD;"| 46-16 ||style="background: #FFE6BD;"| 49-20 ||style="background: #FFE6BD;"|1,499||style="background: #FFE6BD;"|759||style="background: #FFE6BD;"|71.01% overall win percentage
|-
| 1999-2000 || 8-3A || Ken Chandler || 2-8 (0-6)|| 2-8 ||135||225||
|-
| 2000-2001 || 8-3A || Ken Chandler || 1-10 (0-6)|| 1-10 ||76||245||
|-
| 2001-2002 || 8-3A || Ken Chandler || 2-8 (1-5) || 2-8 ||155||195||
|-
| style="background: #FFE6BD;"|3 seasons ||style="background: #FFE6BD;"| ||style="background: #FFE6BD;"|Ken Chandler ||style="background: #FFE6BD;"| 5-26 ||style="background: #FFE6BD;"| 5-26 ||style="background: #FFE6BD;"|366||style="background: #FFE6BD;"|665||style="background: #FFE6BD;"|16.13% overall win percentage
|-
| 2002-2003 || 8-3A ||Wayne Carr || 3-7 (1-5)|| 3-7 ||130||175||
|-
| 2003-2004 || 8-3A || Wayne Carr || 5-5 (4-2)|| 5-6 ||205||196||style="background: #CCFFFF;"|Lost 3A 1st round playoff (West Lauderdale)
|-
| 2004-2005 || 8-3A || Wayne Carr || 3-7 (2-4)|| 3-7 ||170||323||
|-
| 2005-2006 || 8-3A || Wayne Carr || 2-6 (1-5)|| 2-6 ||95||194||
|-
| style="background: #FFE6BD;"|4 seasons ||style="background: #FFE6BD;"| ||style="background: #FFE6BD;"|Wayne Carr ||style="background: #FFE6BD;"| 13-25 ||style="background: #FFE6BD;"| 13-26 ||style="background: #FFE6BD;"|600||style="background: #FFE6BD;"|888||style="background: #FFE6BD;"|33.33% overall win percentage
|-
| 2006-2007 || 8-3A || Perry Wheat || 2-8 (0-6)|| 2-8 ||123||281||
|-
| 2007-2008 || 8-3A || Perry Wheat || 5-5 (3-3)|| 6-6 ||300||337|| style="background: #CCFFFF;"|Won 3A 1st round playoff (South Pike) Lost 3A 2nd round playoff (Raleigh)
|-
| 2008-2009 || 8-3A || Perry Wheat ||7-3 (4-2)||style="background: #FFCCCC;"| 7-4 ||311||203||style="background: #CCFFFF;"| Lost 3A 1st round playoff (Hazelhurst)
|- 
| 2009-2010 || 8-4A || Perry Wheat ||6-4 (4-2) ||style="background: #FFCCCC;"|6-5 ||280||260||style="background: #CCFFFF;"|Lost 4A 1st round playoff (Laurel)
|-
| 2010-2011 || 8-4A || Perry Wheat ||9-1 (5-1) ||style="background: #FFCCCC;"|10-2 ||413||187|| style="background: #CCFFFF;"|Won 4A 1st round playoff (South Pike) Lost 4A 2nd round playoff (Mendenhall)
|-
| 2011-2012 || 7-4A || Perry Wheat ||7-3 (4-1) ||style="background: #FFCCCC;"|7-4 ||271||227|| style="background: #CCFFFF;"|Lost 4A 1st round playoff (Quitman)
|-
| 2012-2013 || 7-4A || Perry Wheat ||8-2 (4-1) ||style="background: #FFCCCC;"|9-4 ||424||245|| style="background: #CCFFFF;"|Won 4A 1st round playoff (Poplarville) Lost 4A 2nd round playoff (Quitman)
|-
| 2013-2014 || 7-4A || Perry Wheat ||9-3 (4-1) ||style="background: #FFCCCC;"|9-3 ||411||231|| style="background: #CCFFFF;"|Won 4A 1st round playoff (Lawrence County) Won 4A 2nd round playoff (Poplarville) Lost 4A 3rd round playoff (Quitman)
|-
| 2014-2015 || 7-4A || Perry Wheat ||11-3 (4-1) ||style="background: #FFCCCC;"|11-3 ||528||391|| style="background: #CCFFFF;"|Won 4A 1st round playoff (Newton County) Won 4A 2nd round playoff (Vancleave)  Won 4A 3rd round playoff (Poplarville) Lost 4A 4th round playoff (St. Stainislaus)
|-
| style="background: #FFE6BD;"|8 seasons ||style="background: #FFE6BD;"| ||style="background: #FFE6BD;"|Perry Wheat ||style="background: #FFE6BD;"| 55-29 ||style="background: #FFE6BD;"| 47-33 ||style="background: #FFE6BD;"|2,122||style="background: #FFE6BD;"|1,740||style="background: #FFE6BD;"|65.47% overall win percentage
|-
| style="background: #FFE6BD;"|43 seasons ||style="background: #FFE6BD;"| ||style="background: #FFE6BD;"|8 coaches ||style="background: #FFE6BD;"| ||style="background: #FFE6BD;"| ||style="background: #FFE6BD;"| ||style="background: #FFE6BD;"| ||style="background: #FFE6BD;"|18 playoff appearances  6 Division Titles  19 winning seasons
|}

2005-2006 Season shortened by Hurricane Katrina.

Due to actions on part of both schools in a past season, Purvis High School and Lumberton High School can no longer compete with each other in football.

Arts
Pride of Purvis Band

The band, currently under direction of Nicole Allen, has achieved many honors.

Theatre

Under the former direction of Parker McMullan, the Purvis High School Theatre Department has prevailed in many competitions across the state.  Every year, Purvis High School attends the Southwest Drama Festival hosted at the University of Southern Mississippi.  They have received over thirteen All-Star cast medals, a distinguished play award advancing them to the Mississippi Theatre Association Festival, and an Outstanding Leadership Award.  Purvis also participates at the Mississippi Theatre Association Festival.  At MTA, Purvis has placed in the design competitions for the past four years, received several all-star cast medals, and have won awards in the 10 Minute Play Competition.  At the end of the 2006-2007 school year, Purvis was selected to attend the 2008 American High School Theatre Festival in Edinburgh, Scotland.  In early August 2008, Purvis traveled to Scotland and performed.  Mrs. Parker McMullan stepped down as director at the end of the 2008-2009 school year.  The Purvis High School Theatre Department is currently under the direction of Ms. Dana Coghlan and is in a process of "reorganization".

References

External links
 

Public high schools in Mississippi
Schools in Lamar County, Mississippi